Events from the year 1658 in Ireland.

Incumbent
Lord Protector: Oliver Cromwell (until 3 September), then Richard Cromwell

Events
 September 3 – Richard Cromwell proclaimed Lord Protector of England, Scotland and Ireland upon the death of his father, Oliver Cromwell.

Births
Francis Makemie, clergyman, considered to be the founder of Presbyterianism in the US (d.1708)

Deaths

References

 
1650s in Ireland
Ireland
Years of the 17th century in Ireland